The Telocvicna Jednota Sokol hall, also known as Brush Creek Hall , is a building located southwest of Wilber in rural Saline County, Nebraska.  The building was constructed in 1888.  Historically, it served as a host for Sokol gymnastic events and as a meeting hall for the Czech community.  It subsequently hosted meetings of other organizations, such as 4-H, and served as an election hall for its precinct.  In 1985, it was listed in the National Register of Historic Places.

See also 
 Sokol
 Telocvicna Jednota "T.J." Sokol Hall

References

External links 
 
 Jim McKee: Czech immigrants and Sokol organizations in Nebraska

Czech-American culture in Nebraska
Buildings and structures in Saline County, Nebraska
Clubhouses on the National Register of Historic Places in Nebraska
Cultural infrastructure completed in 1888
Sokol in the United States
National Register of Historic Places in Saline County, Nebraska